Magnolia High School is a public high school in Anaheim, California, located in the Southwest Anaheim region. It is part of the Anaheim Union High School District. The school is named after the nearest major street to the west.

Demographics
The demographic breakdown of 1,815 students enrolled for 2012-2012 was:
Male - 51.7%
Female - 48.3%
Native American/Alaskan - 0.1%
Asian/Pacific islanders - 15%
Black - 2.5%
Hispanic - 72.1%
White - 9%
Multiracial - 0.5%

77.1% of the students qualified for free or reduced lunch.

Notable alumni

 Hank Bauer, football player
 James Blaylock, science fiction writer
 Tony Cadena, aka Anthony Brandenburg, lead singer for The Adolescents
 Brian Downing, former major league baseball designated hitter, outfielder, and catcher
 Todd Jones, basketball coach and successful businessman
 Pat Martin, broadcaster at KMET Los Angeles, KGB San Diego, and KRXQ Sacramento
 Michael Orozco, soccer player
Bill Bensley, architect, Architectural Digest top 100

References

External links
 Anaheim Union High School District

High schools in Anaheim, California
Public high schools in California
1961 establishments in California